Myrlaea is a genus of moths of the family Pyralidae described by Émile Louis Ragonot in 1887.

Species
Myrlaea albistrigata (Staudinger, 1881)
Myrlaea dentilineella Ragonot, 1887
Myrlaea serratella Ragonot, 1893
Myrlaea orcella (Ragonot, 1887)

References

Phycitini
Pyralidae genera
Taxa named by Émile Louis Ragonot